Voghji, is a former village in Syunik Province of Armenia, currently part of town of Kajaran.

See also 
Syunik Province

References 

Populated places in Syunik Province